Jérôme Erceau (born January 14, 1973 in La Roche-sur-Yon) is a French former professional football player and current coach. Between June 2011 and February 2012, he managed FC Martigues in the Championnat National.

He played professionally in Ligue 2 for La Roche VF, USL Dunkerque, Amiens SC, Le Mans Union Club 72, ES Wasquehal, CS Louhans-Cuiseaux and FC Martigues.

In June 2011, Erceau was named as head coach of FC Martigues, where he spent six years of his playing career.

1973 births
Living people
French footballers
Ligue 2 players
La Roche VF players
Amiens SC players
Le Mans FC players
Louhans-Cuiseaux FC players
FC Martigues players
Association football defenders
Wasquehal Football players